Stammham is the smallest municipality in the district of Altötting in Bavaria in Germany. It lies on the river Inn, close to Marktl, the birthplace of Pope Benedict XVI.

References

Altötting (district)
Populated places on the Inn (river)